Hichem Daoud (born 9 January 1992) is an Algerian handball player for Limoges HB.

He competed for the Algerian national team at the 2015 World Men's Handball Championship in Qatar.

He also participated at the 2011 and 2013 World Championships.

References

1992 births
Living people
Algerian male handball players
African Games bronze medalists for Algeria
African Games medalists in handball
Competitors at the 2011 All-Africa Games
21st-century Algerian people